Ultravox or Ultravox Media On Demand Server (UltraMODS), is a streaming video project by AOL.  The goal is to create something like SHOUTcast but for routers, so that the data is handled much better, can handle more users efficiently, and channel changing is much faster.

Marketing 
Certain streams made available by Shoutcast use Ultravox.  AOL Radio has since moved to a non-streaming "beamcast" approach to music listening as of late Summer 2008.  CBS Radio stations featured on AOL Radio use a variety of streaming methods not limited to Ultravox.

Technology 
This format uses uvox URLs, and can be viewed in Winamp.  Nullsoft is reportedly helping AOL create Ultravox.  Nullsoft also released Nullsoft Streaming Video, which is streamed over Ultravox software.

Michael Wise is on the ISMA Board of Directors, and is reported as being actively involved in AOL’s streaming technology planning. In an effort to drive interoperability and lower distribution costs, he and his team are now working to standardize key parts of Ultravox, AOL’s own streaming technology platform.

Ultravox is implemented in servers and in the firmware of certain routers to provide efficient, scalable delivery to hundreds of thousands of customers simultaneously.

See also
 AOL Radio

Notes

External links
Official site
CNet

TheInquirer - AOL to ditch Real Networks in Netscape Radio?
Flexbeta - AOL pulls Nullsoft file-sharing software (Read last paragraph for blurb about Ultravox)

AOL
Film and video technology
Internet Protocol based network software
Servers (computing)